Uva is an unincorporated community in Platte County, Wyoming, United States.

Notable person
Joe Chasteen, Wyoming legislator, was born in Uva.

Notes

Unincorporated communities in Platte County, Wyoming
Unincorporated communities in Wyoming